Beneath Us is a 2019 American horror-thriller film written by Max Pachman and Mark Mavrothalasitis, and directed by Pachman. The film stars Lynn Collins, Rigo Sanchez, Josue Aguirre, James Tupper, Roberto Sanchez, and Thomas Chavira. It was released theatrically in the United States by Vital Pictures on March 6, 2020.

Plot
A group of undocumented workers hired by a wealthy American couple are held against their will at the couple’s secluded mansion, and must fight to prove they are not expendable and cannot be discarded so easily.

Cast
 Lynn Collins as Liz Rhodes
 Rigo Sanchez as Alejandro
 Josue Aguirre as Memo
 James Tupper as Ben Rhodes
 Thomas Chavira as Tonio
 Nicholas Gonzalez Homero Silva
 Edy Ganem as Sandra Silva
 Andrew Burlinson as Richard
 David Castro as Jesus

Production
Beneath Us is Max Pachman's feature directorial debut, and is produced by Luis Guerrero and Chris Lemos, with Jay Hernandez and William Knochel serving as executive producers. It features English and Spanish dialogue. Guerrero said the film was in the works since 2011. In 2017, it was reported that Premiere Entertainment Group had picked up worldwide rights to the film.

Release
The film premiered at the Phoenix Film Festival on April 11, 2019. The film was released theatrically in the United States on March 6, 2020, by Vital Pictures/NME, and it is the first film distributed by the company.

References

External links 
 

2019 films
2010s Spanish-language films
Films about illegal immigration to the United States
2019 horror thriller films
2010s English-language films